Nam Duniya Nam Style (English: Our world our style) is a 2013 Indian Kannada adventure film, written, directed and produced by Preetham Gubbi. It stars Likith Shetty, Vinayak Joshi, Krishna, Sonia Gowda, Milana Nagaraj, Kavya Shetty.

Synopsis
The film is "about three people who hail from different backgrounds and who have been friends for 15 years. The trio are a jovial and fun-loving lot, and are excited about their first travel abroad together", said Preetham, who admitted he was inspired by the Hindi film Dil Chahta Hai.

Cast
 Likith Shetty as Preetham
 Krishna as Yogi
 Vinayak Joshi as Umesh Shetty
 Sonia Gowda as Maya
 Milana Nagaraj as Milana 
 Kavya Shetty as Radha
 Rangayana Raghu
 Sadhu Kokila
 Padmaja Rao

Production 
The film was extensively shot in Karnataka, Kashmir and Malaysia.

Music
The music of the film was composed by Shaan Rahman which marked his debut in Kannada cinema.

Release

Critical reception 
A critic from The Times of India wrote that "Director Preetham Gubbi, one of the talented directors in Sandalwood, could have done a better job of the romantic story with some lively sequences". A. Sharadhaa of The New Indian Express wrote that "Nam Duniya, Nam Style is missing Preetham Gubbi’s magic".

References

External links
 

2013 films
2010s Kannada-language films
Films scored by Shaan Rahman
Indian road movies
Indian coming-of-age films
Films directed by Preetham Gubbi